Vadsco Sales was a holding company for makers of perfumes, toiletries, drugs, etc., which was formed in New York City in the 1920s. V. Vivaudou, an auto company, and perfume manufacturer, was one of its subsidiaries. The Vadsco Sales Corporation was a consolidation (business) of
V. Vivaudou, Inc., the American Druggists Syndicate, and Kny Scheerer Corporation. The latter firm was among the oldest and largest manufacturers and dealers of surgical and hospital supplies and equipment in the United States.

Additional companies included in the December 1928 merger which formed Vadsco Sales were the Alfred H. Smith Company, Farfumerie Melba, Inc., Delettrez, Inc., and Kleanwell, Inc. Each of the individual businesses retained its trade name and its trademark. 

The merger of Delettrez, Inc., and its parent company, Vadsco Sales, in April 1943, resulted in the creation of Universal Laboratories.

References

Companies based in New York City
1943 disestablishments in New York (state)
Defunct companies based in New York (state)
Holding companies established in 1928
1928 establishments in New York City
Holding companies disestablished in 1943
1943 mergers and acquisitions
American companies disestablished in 1943
American companies established in 1928